A morality clause (also known as a morals clause, bad boy clause or bad girl clause) is a provision within instruments of a contract which curtail, or restrain, or proscribe certain behavior of individuals or party(s) to the contract.

A moral clause within contracts is used as a means of holding the individual or party(s) to a certain behavioral standard so as not to bring disrepute, contempt or scandal to other individual or party to the contract and their interests. It attempts to preserve a public and private image of such a party to the contract. In essence, one party to the contract is purchasing the other party's good name or reputation. These clauses are most seen in contracts between actors and actresses and their studios, the field of education (especially minors), athletes and their organization or proprietors of a product that the athlete(s) may endorse or as a part of a marital settlement. Commonly proscribed activity include the use or abuse of alcohol, the use of illegal drugs or narcotics or illegal or illicit sexual activity.

Background
The impetus for a morals clause in contracts for 'talent,' i.e., artistic performers appears to have been a reaction to the Roscoe 'Fatty' Arbuckle case in 1921. Subsequent to media outcry, Universal Studios decided to add a morals clause to contracts. The text of the 1921 Universal Studios clause read as follows: "The actor (actress) agrees to conduct himself (herself) with due regard to public conventions and morals and agrees that he (she) will not do or commit anything tending to degrade him (her) in society or bring him (her) into public hatred, contempt, scorn or ridicule, or tending to shock, insult or offend the community or outrage public morals or decency, or tending to the prejudice of the Universal Film Manufacturing Company or the motion picture industry. In the event that the actor (actress) violates any term or provision of this paragraph, then the Universal Film Manufacturing Company has the right to cancel and annul this contract by giving five (5) days' notice to the actor (actress) of its intention to do so."

The first morals clause for a professional athlete may be a November 11, 1922 contract addendum for Babe Ruth. The clause stated: 

Apparently, Colonel Jake Ruppert (owner of the Yankees) had also hoped to curtail the Babe's notorious womanizing. Ruth is quoted as replying, "I'll promise to go easier on drinking and to get to bed earlier, but not for you, fifty thousand dollars, or two-hundred and fifty thousand dollars will I give up women. They're too much fun."

21st century use

 morals clauses still exist widely for athletes, and in fact, may be invoked more quickly than in the past, as in the case of Ryan Lochte.

See also
 Endorsement (disambiguation)
 Entertainment law
 Moral turpitude
 Personality rights

References

Contract law
Law and morality
Sports law
Law and economics
Entertainment law
Baseball law